Soulnik is the second of two albums led by American jazz bassist Doug Watkins featuring tracks recorded in 1960 and released on the New Jazz label.

Reception

Scott Yanow of Allmusic states, "The use of oboe and cello on some numbers makes the date stand out a bit from the usual hard bop sessions of the period and straight-ahead jazz fans will want to get this".

Track listing
All compositions by Yusef Lateef except as indicated
 "One Guy" - 6:17     
 "Confessin' (That I Love You)" (Doc Daugherty, Al J. Neiburg, Ellis Reynolds) - 6:47     
 "Soulnik" - 5:44     
 "Andre's Bag" (Doug Watkins) - 6:58     
 "I Remember You" (Johnny Mercer, Victor Schertzinger) - 5:35     
 "Imagination" (Johnny Burke, Jimmy Van Heusen) - 6:10

Personnel
Doug Watkins - cello
Yusef Lateef - tenor saxophone, flute, oboe 
Hugh Lawson - piano
Herman Wright - bass
Lex Humphries - drums

References 

1960 albums
Doug Watkins albums
New Jazz Records albums
Albums recorded at Van Gelder Studio
Albums produced by Esmond Edwards